Imran Ahmed is a First-class and List A cricketer from Bangladesh. He was born on 1 April 1981 in Mymensingh, made his debut for Barisal Division in 2000/01 and proved a stalwart member of the team through to the 2009/10 season. He also appeared for Bangladesh Under-23s in 2003/04, Bangladesh in 1998/99 and the Bangladesh Youth XI in 1999/00. A right-handed batsman, he has scored 5 first-class hundreds and 15 fifties with a best of 177 against Chittagong Division. He also scored 152* against Rajshahi Division. He has taken 5 first-class wickets with his occasional off breaks. His best first-class century, 115, came against Chittagong Division.

References

Bangladeshi cricketers
Barisal Division cricketers
Living people
1981 births
Dhaka Division cricketers
Bangladesh under-23 cricketers
People from Mymensingh